Bagh-e Babuiyeh (also Romanized as Bāgh-e Bābū’īyeh; also known as Bāghbāghū’īyeh) is a village in Khatunabad Rural District, in the Central District of Jiroft County, Kerman Province, Iran. At the 2006 census, its population was 1,993, in 441 families.

References 

Populated places in Jiroft County